

Deep Creek National Park, formerly the Deep Creek Conservation Park, is a protected area in the Australian state of South Australia located on the southern coast of Fleurieu Peninsula in the gazetted localities of Deep Creek and Delamere about  east of Cape Jervis.

History
Formerly a conservation park known as Deep Creek Conservation Park, it was renamed Deep Creek National Park upon being proclaimed a national park on 26  November 2021

Description
The park is the largest portion of remaining natural vegetation on the Fleurieu Peninsula, and is home to much native wildlife, including western grey kangaroos, short-beaked echidnas and around 100 species of birds.

The park encompasses  of coastline, which include views across Backstairs Passage to Kangaroo Island. The conservation park consists of mainly rolling coastal hills, the gullies of which contain orchids and ferns, while the hilltops have stunted scrub and low windswept trees. Walking trails (including part of the famous Heysen Trail) provide access to most of the conservation park.

It is classified as an IUCN class II protected area.  In 1980, it was listed on the now-defunct Register of the National Estate.

Camping 
The conservation park has five camping areas available with various facilities.
 Stringybark: A sheltered forest setting with 16 sites, hot showers, toilets and rain water. Sites available for caravans and camp trailers. No powered sites available.
 Trig: Central to the main hiking trails, open grassy areas with many well-sheltered and shady sites. 25 sites, toilets and rain water available. Sites available for caravans and camp trailers. No powered sites available.
 Tapanappa: 18 moderately sheltered sites with spectacular coastal views close by. Toilets and rain water available.
 Cobbler Hill: 10 sites with toilets and rain water close to Blowhole Beach. Can be exposed during windy conditions.
 Eagle Waterhole: Located on the Heysen Trail, and only able to be used by hikers. A hikers' hut and rainwater tank have been erected at this site.

Gallery

See also
Deep Creek (disambiguation)

References

Notes

Citations

External links

 Protected Planet website
BirdsSA website

Fleurieu Peninsula
1971 establishments in Australia
Protected areas established in 1971
South Australian places listed on the defunct Register of the National Estate
National parks of South Australia